Reclus Peninsula is a  peninsula on the west coast of Graham Land in Antarctica, enclosing Charlotte Bay to its east. It was first charted in 1898 by the Belgian Antarctic Expedition under Adrien de Gerlache, who named its northern extremity "Cap Reclus" for the French geographer and author Élisée Reclus (1830–1905). The UK-APC extended the name Reclus to the entire peninsula in 1960.

It was first shown on an Argentine government chart of 1954, and given its descriptive name by the UK Antarctic Place-Names Committee in 1960.

References 

Peninsulas of Graham Land
Danco Coast